"The Return of Ansel Gibbs" was an American television play broadcast on November 27, 1958, as part of the CBS television series, Playhouse 90.

Plot
A retired diplomat, Ansel Gibbs, accepts a position in Washington, D.C., as "Special Assistant to the President for Disarmament". He is invited onto a television show where the host seeks to humiliate him. Gibbs contemplates withdrawing from the nomination but elects to proceed to the Senate confirmation hearing and is approved.

Cast
The cast included the following:

 Melvyn Douglas as Ansel Gibbs
 Diana Lynn as Anne
 Mary Astor as Sylvia
 Earl Holliman as Robin Tripp
 Loring Smith as Sen. Farwell
 Ilka Chase as Louise
 John Hoyt as Porter Hoye

Production
The program aired on November 27, 1958, on the CBS television series Playhouse 90. It was written by David Davidson based on Frederick Buechner's novel. John Houseman was the producer and Ralph Nelson the director.

Reception
John P. Shanley in The New York Times found the production to be melodramatic, artificial, and unsatisfactory.

References

1958 American television episodes
Playhouse 90 (season 3) episodes
1958 television plays